M. Schuyler Towne (born Mohandas Schuyler Towne; December 16, 1983) is a competitive lockpicker and pioneer of the American Locksport movement. He was "first introduced to lockpicking at the 2006 Hackers on Planet Earth conference in New York." At that conference Towne became one of the founding board members of The Open Organization Of Lockpickers US chapter and in 2007 he launched Non-Destructive Entry Magazine. Towne has competed in the Dutch Open at LockCon in the Netherlands and both spoken and competed at DEF CON in Las Vegas. His last public talk was given at SecTor 2018.

Kickstarter controversy
In 2010 Schuyler Towne created a project called "Open Locksport" on the crowd funding website Kickstarter. The basis for the Kickstarter project was to provide Towne with funding to produce a range of custom lock picks and practice locks as well as other rewards. The project aimed to raise $6000 USD and upon its completion on September 25, 2010 had raised $87,407 with a total of 1,159 backers. In return for their funding, the Kickstarter backers were to receive various rewards. Those with pledges of $35 or more would receive lock pick sets of various sizes, with two backers pledging the maximum amount of $2,500.

It was later revealed by Towne that he had used some of the Kickstarter funds for personal reasons. These expenditures included travel and living expenses, car insurance and repairs, computer hardware and other undisclosed expenses. Towne also used the funds to take his family on a holiday and purchase a TV.

2012 
In June 2012 Schuyler Towne was admitted into psychiatric care. In August, a group of people (The Repair Board) agreed with Towne to assist in the running and delivery of the Kickstarter rewards. On August 23, practice kit rewards started being packaged and shipped out to backers. This set of mailings did not include the picks.

On September 26 the CAD drawings for the picks were released, satisfying the $5 tier. Towne had also found work and made some speaking appearances in order to help fund the ongoing work for the Kickstarter. On October 17 Towne received prototype picks and uploaded a video of himself testing them. These picks were also tested by other lock picking community members before being confirmed for shipping.

2013 
By January 1, 2013 the pick design and production process was finalized. Unfortunately, funding for full production fell short by just over $33000. The Repair Board sought funding options and Schuyler Towne sought better employment. By May 2, The Board had agreed to several financial commitments from Towne, and developed a plan aimed at completing the Kickstarter. Partial sales of picks were to be used (along with Towne's contributions) to fund the delivery of picks to the backers.

2014 
On January 27, 2014 a web store was opened to handle the selling of picks. The inventory and order handling was controlled by Jason Scott and the store promised to only sell items that were produced and ready to ship. The store's inventory sold and was packed for shipping by the next day. It was also confirmed that all backers who contributed $500 or more have had their rewards shipped to them.

Progress continued on for several months until sometime after March. Schuyler Towne began to suffer from depression and suicidal thoughts again, and this affected his work. The Board continued their part in the Kickstarter deliveries while Towne continued to be assisted with his problems. On August 12, the lock libraries (offered to the highest 2 tiers) started being sent out to backers. By November 11 the $250 tier was essentially finished and all the lock libraries were prepared to be sent.

2015 
On January 30, 2015 Schuyler Towne posted an update to the Kickstarter. He claimed that progress was moving on slowly with the lockpick sets due, mainly, to personal problems. He also wrote about problems encountered during manufacture and about his process. He updated the campaign on his personal situation. Three months later on April 16 it was announced that no picks had been forthcoming from Towne and that the progress on the Kickstarter had halted. After this announcement, no further picks were delivered.

On September 8, 2015 the Repair Board withdrew from offering support. Their justification being that they had served their purpose of getting Towne to deliver on a lot of his promises and to help him with his mental problems. All materials relating to the Kickstarter were returned to Towne and his Kickstarter account returned to him. Backers in all but the $35 – 100 tiers had their picks and other rewards sent to them; orders for picks within that tier had not been fulfilled.

References

External links 
 Towne's home page.
 Album of images relating to the fulfillment of the Kickstarter.

1983 births
Living people
Artists from Burlington, Vermont
American graphic designers
Kickstarter projects